Mittelstadt or Mittelstädt may refer to:

A mid-sized town in Germany
Casey Mittelstadt (born 1998), American ice hockey player
Kelly Mittelstadt (born 1975), Canadian curler
Maximilian Mittelstädt (born 1997), German footballer